Scotts LawnService was a subdivision of the Scotts Miracle-Gro Company, an American multinational corporation headquartered in Marysville, Ohio. It was founded with the acquisition of Emerald Green Lawn Care in 1998 and was merged into TruGreen in 2016.

History and overview

Scotts LawnService was founded in 1998, with the acquisition of Emerald Green Lawn Care. It was a division of the Scotts Miracle-Gro Company, and provided lawn, tree, and shrub care and pest control.

In April 2016 TruGreen announced that it had merged with Scotts LawnService. After the merger the Scotts brand was no longer used, and Scotts customers no longer received Scotts brand products as part of their lawn treatments; they were instead switched over to products used by TruGreen. The Scotts Miracle-Gro Company retained a 30% stake in the company after the merger, with the option to buy the operations back in the future from TruGreen.

In 2019, Scotts Miracle-Gro sold its 30% minority stake in TruGreen for approximately $234 million.

Mergers and acquisitions

 2002: Scotts LawnService acquires The Lawn Company, a major lawn care service company in the Boston area, and substantially all of the lawn care operations of Centex HomeTeam Services, a division of Centex Corporation.
 2016: Scotts LawnService merges with TruGreen.
 2019: Scotts Miracle-Gro Company sells its stake in TruGreen

References

External links
Scotts LawnService Company
The Scotts Miracle-Gro Company official website (now a site for online sales of lawn care products)

Companies established in 1998
Companies based in Ohio
1998 establishments in Ohio